Etelinae is a subfamily of marine ray-finned fishes, one of four subfamilies classified within the family Lutjanidae, the snappers.

Genera
The subfamily Etelinae contains 5 genera and 24 species:

  Aphareus Cuvier, 1870
 Aprion Valenciennes, 1830
 Etelis Cuvier, 1828
 Pristipomoides Bleeker, 2020
 Randallichthys Anderson, Kami & Johnson, 1977

References

Lutjanidae
Ray-finned fish subfamilies